Idoxifene (INN, USAN, BAN) (former developmental code names CB-7432, SB-223030), also known as pyrrolidino-4-iodotamoxifen, is a nonsteroidal selective estrogen receptor modulator (SERM) of the triphenylethylene group which was under development for the treatment of breast cancer and postmenopausal osteoporosis but was never marketed. It reached phase III clinical trials for postmenopausal osteoporosis and phase II clinical trials for breast cancer before development was discontinued in 1999 due to insufficient effectiveness in both cases.

Chemistry

Synthesis
A large-scale chemical synthesis of idoxifene has been devised.

References

External links
 Idoxifene - AdisInsight

Hormonal antineoplastic drugs
Iodoarenes
Phenol ethers
Pyrrolidines
Selective estrogen receptor modulators
Triphenylethylenes
Abandoned drugs